Eragrostis trichodes, the sand lovegrass, is a warm season perennial bunchgrass native to North America.

Description
Eragrostis trichodes is most common in sandy soil of the prairies on the central and southern Great Plains.

The diffuse seedhead is often half the size of the entire Sand lovegrass plant.

External links

trichodes
Bunchgrasses of North America
Grasses of the United States
Native grasses of the Great Plains region
Flora of the United States
Native grasses of Texas
Native grasses of Nebraska
Native grasses of Oklahoma